= Bahk Jong-sun =

South Korean artist (born 1969)

Bahk Jong-sun (Korean: 박종선; born 1969) is a South Korean artist. He was born in North Chungcheong Province. He finds inspiration in the Korean furniture tradition dating back to the 17th and 18th centuries, as well as in the clean, linear forms of mid-century Scandinavian modernism. Bahk is well known for his modernist forms created by using natural wood.

== Work ==
=== Selected solo exhibitions ===
- 2010 Echo, Ishikawa International Salon, Kanazawa
- 2010 Time of Wood, Gallery SEOMI, Seoul
- 2009 Journey with Wood, Topohaus, Seoul
- 2009 The Journey to Somewhere, Gallery Corner, Seoul
- 2009 Water, Islet & Repose, Craft Awon, Seoul
- 2007 The Forest of Light and Sound, Craft Awon, Seoul
- 2006 Make a Sound in Wooden Furniture, Haslla Artworld, Gangwon
- 2006 The Sound of Landscape, Chiak Artcenter, Wonju, Gangwon
- 2005 Speak Seriously to the Tree, Gallery Leeham, Wonju, Gangwon

=== Selected group exhibitions ===
- 2015 Korea now! Design, Craft, Fashion and Graphic Design in Korea exhibition, Musée des Arts décoratifs, Paris, France
- 2015 Living in Art II, Connect, Seomi International, Los Angeles, CA, USA
- 2015 Living in Art, Seomi International, Los Angeles, CA, USA.
- 2013 Contemporary Korean Design 2, R20th Century Gallery, New York
- 2010 Contemporary Korean Design, R20th Century Design Gallery, New York
- 2009 A Collision of Sentiments, Acozza Gallery, Wonju, Gangwon
- 2008 Empty Project "The Light", Seogok Church, Wonju, Gangwon The Story of City at Three Persons, Samil Road Storage Theatre, Seoul
- 2005 Asia Pacific Weeks Berlin 2005 Focus Korea, Nomadic Plaza, Berlin

== Awards ==
- 2011 Yumin Creative Awards, The Yumin Cultural Foundation & JoongAng Ilbo Newspaper, Korea

== Collections ==
- 2011 Hana Bank Training Institute, Korea

== Fairs ==
- 2015 Design Miami/Basel
- 2014 Design Miami/Basel, Basel
- 2013 Design Miami/Basel, Basel
- 2012 Design Miami/, Miami PAD, Pavilion of Art & Design, London Design Miami/Basel, Basel
- 2011 Design Miami/, Miami Design Miami/Basel, Basel
- 2010 Design Miami/, Miami Design Miami/Basel, Basel
- 2009 Design Miami/, Miami
